Bramley is a village in Derbyshire, England. It is in the civil parish of Eckington.

Villages in Derbyshire
Eckington, Derbyshire